Pierre Deniker (16 February 1917, in Paris – 17 August 1998) was involved, jointly with Jean Delay and J. M. Harl, in the introduction of chlorpromazine (Thorazine), the first antipsychotic used in the treatment of schizophrenia, in the 1950s. Thorazine had been used in surgical procedures peri-operatively as an anti-nausea medication in France. Patients were noted to be less anxious and calmer. This observation eventually led Deniker to try chlorpromazine with patients who had schizophrenia, where he observed notable improvement in symptoms.

The pharmaceutical company Smith-Kline had purchased the chlorpromazine rights from Rhone-Poulenc in France and had been marketing it as an anti-nausea medication. After Deniker's observations, they sought and received FDA approval in 1954 to market Thorazine for the treatment of schizophrenia.

References

1917 births
1998 deaths
Physicians from Paris
French psychiatrists
20th-century French physicians
Recipients of the Lasker-DeBakey Clinical Medical Research Award